The Iran Film Foundation is a non-political UK unregistered charity with a mission to promote and preserve the cinematic history of the Persian speaking world. The remit of the Foundation is specific and is only related to cinematic history, television history and the moving image. The Foundation covers the late nineteenth century to the present day.

The Foundation achieves its objectives by organising and supporting lectures, cultural events and conferences, for archivists, and by supporting publications and museum programs.

The Foundation is funded by contributions from trustees and patrons and by various fund-raising events. The Foundation does not accept financial support from any Government, Semi-Government organisations or lobbying groups. The IFF is governed by a body of trustees supported by a Film and Moving Image Committee.

History 

The organizers of the Foundation have contributed to the Iranian film industry during the past ten years prior to the formal founding of group.

Prior to the formal registration of the organization, the organizers of the foundation worked to build and contribute to publication of several art documentaries in both the English language and Persian.

The Foundation has also offered some of its catalogue to large organizations based in Europe for the dissemination of historical archive footage in 2014, notably the recent Iran history series at universities in the United Kingdom.

In 2015, members of the moving image committee contributed to the Berlin Film Festival with supporting the distribution of Iranian cinematography through access deals.

See also
Iranian studies
Azerbaijani art
Culture of Iran
International rankings of Iran
Iran's House of Art
Iranian modern and contemporary art
 List of Iranian films
 International Fajr Film Festival
 London Iranian Film Festival
 Bāgh-e Ferdows, Film Museum of Iran
 Persian theatre
 Persian Film

References

External links
The Iran Film Foundation - UK

Foundations based in the United Kingdom
Iranian culture
Politics of Iran
Persian art